Salvador Vieira Gordo (born January 7th 2003) is an Angolan swimmer. He competed for Angola at the 2020 Summer Olympics in the men's 100m butterfly event. He finished in 54th place overall with a time of 55.96 in his heat.

He has committed to swimming at the University of Tampa in the United States.

References

External links
 

Swimmers at the 2020 Summer Olympics
Olympic swimmers of Angola

Living people
2003 births
Sportspeople from Luanda
Angolan people of Portuguese descent
University of Tampa alumni
Angolan male swimmers
Male butterfly swimmers